The lobster buoy hitch is similar to the buntline hitch, but made with a cow hitch around the standing part rather than a clove hitch.

Like the buntline hitch, this knot is strong, secure and compact.

See also
List of knots

References 

Clifford W. Ashley. The Ashley Book of Knots. Doubleday, New York. #1714, p. 295.